Kirillovka is a rural locality (a village) in Chaykovsky, Perm Krai, Russia. The population was 138 as of 2010.

Geography 
Kirillovka is located 44 km southeast of Chaykovsky. Alnyash is the nearest rural locality.

References 

Rural localities in Chaykovsky urban okrug